Peter Clifford William James Beadle (born 13 May 1972) is an English football manager and former player who was recently manager of  club Yate Town.

A former player, Beadle played as a forward and he scored some 83 goals in 355 league games, mostly for the two Bristol clubs. He started his career at Gillingham in 1989 and won a £300,000 move to Tottenham Hotspur two years later. However, he never made a first team appearance for "Spurs" and was instead loaned out to AFC Bournemouth and Southend United, before he was transferred to Watford in September 1994. He moved on to Bristol Rovers a year later and after an impressive spell with the club was signed by Port Vale for £300,000 in August 1998. He was sold on to Notts County in February 1999 for £250,000, before moving to Bristol City for £200,000 seven months later. He spent four years with the club, as City reached the Football League Trophy final twice, losing in 2000 and winning in 2003. He retired after brief spells with Brentford, Barnet, Team Bath and Clevedon Town.

He entered management with Newport County in October 2005. He kept the club in the Conference South, and led the club to the FAW Premier Cup final in 2007 and 2008, losing in 2007 and in 2008. However, he was sacked in April 2008, after his team narrowly missed out on the play-offs for a second successive season. He then spent a brief spell in charge at Clevedon Town in 2010, and since then specialised in training roles with younger players, and was appointed director of youth football at Hereford United in April 2013. He was named caretaker manager at Hereford in March 2014 following the departure of Martin Foyle as first team boss. In April 2015 he was named as the first manager of new club Hereford and led the club to the Midland Football League title in 2015–16, as well as the Midland Football League Cup and Herefordshire County Cup, and the FA Vase final. He then led Hereford to successive Southern League Division One South & West and Premier Division titles in the 2016–17 and 2017–18 seasons, before being sacked in September 2018. He returned to management at Barnet in August 2020, though left the club four months later. He returned to management with Yate Town for a brief spell from May to October 2022.

Playing career

Gillingham
A striker, he made his debut at Fourth Division club Gillingham at the age of 16, against Cardiff City at Priestfield Stadium on 11 March 1989. He joined Southern League Southern Division side Margate on loan and made his debut for the "Gate" on 31 March 1990, in a 2–1 defeat to Dunstable at Hartsdown Park. The loan was expected to last until the end of the 1989–90 season, however he was recalled to Gillingham in early April and turned professional at the club the following month. He made 76 appearances in all competitions for Gillingham, scoring 15 goals, as Damien Richardson's "Gills" struggled in mid-table in 1990–91 and 1991–92.

Spurs to Watford
His promise earned him a move to Premier League side Tottenham Hotspur in June 1992, who spent £300,000 to secure his services, a club record for Gillingham. He had supported the club as a boy. He was loaned out to Tony Pulis' Second Division side AFC Bournemouth at the end of the 1992–93 season, where he scored twice in nine games. At the end of 1993–94 he joined First Division club Southend United on loan, scoring once in eight appearances for Peter Taylor's side. He never made it onto the pitch for a competitive game at White Hart Lane and in September 1994 he was allowed to join Glenn Roeder's Watford for £5,000 plus a 20% sell on fee. This move was not a success, as proven by his record of just one goal in 24 league and cup appearances. After missing out on the First Division play-offs in 1994–95, Watford were relegated at the end of 1995–96.

Bristol Rovers
Beadle escaped Watford before the club were relegated, having signed for Bristol Rovers in November 1995, manager John Ward paying a £30,000 fee. Rovers missed out on the play-offs by just three points in 1995–96. Rovers struggled in 1996–97 under rookie manager Ian Holloway, and Beadle was the club's top scorer with 12 goals in 43 games, hitting a hat-trick past Bury at the Memorial Stadium. He hit fifteen league goals in 1997–98 and his new strike partner Barry Hayles was the division's leading scorer with 23 strikes. Thanks to Beadle and Hayles, Rovers outscored the rest of the clubs in the division, though a leaky defence cost them an automatic promotion place, and an aggregate 4–3 defeat to Northampton Town at the play-off semi-final stage lost them the chance of second tier football. He scored two hat-tricks throughout the campaign, the first coming in a 5–3 thriller at home to former club Bournemouth and the second coming in a 5–0 demolition of Wigan Athletic.

Port Vale to Notts County
Beadle joined John Rudge's First Division Port Vale for £300,000 in August 1998. He scored six goals in 26 games, but new manager Brian Horton sold him on to Sam Allardyce's Second Division Notts County for £250,000 in February 1999. In total he scored nine goals in forty games in 1998–99 for both clubs. After ten appearances in 1999–2000, he was sold to league rivals Bristol City for £200,000 in September 1999.

Bristol City
The move to Bristol City reunited him with former boss Tony Pulis. Beadle scored ten goals in 34 games for City in 1999–2000, helping the club to reach the Football League Trophy final at Wembley by scoring in both legs of the semi-final against Exeter City. However the "Robins" lost 2–1 to Stoke City in the final. He finished the 2000–01 season with just five goals in forty games, as the "Reds" finished a disappointing ninth. In September 2001, Luton Town manager Joe Kinnear was rumoured to be considering a move for the striker, who was on the sidelines recovering from a knee injury. However Beadle underwent an operation on his knee the next month, following advice from his surgeon. The injury kept him out of action for the entirety of the 2001–02 campaign.

In September 2002, Beadle was told he could leave the club on loan. Colchester United manager Steve Whitton confirmed he was interested in signing the striker, but no deal was made. City reached Football League Trophy for a second time in three years at the end of the season. They tasted victory at the Millennium Stadium, beating Carlisle United 2–0 with goals from Peacock and Rosenior; Beadle was an unused substitute. He posted 32 appearances in 2002–03, scoring four goals. Beadle was released by the club in July 2003, with manager Danny Wilson looking to cut his wage bill in order to make new signings. He then went on trial at Cheltenham Town, but was not offered a contract.

Later career
Beadle signed a one-month contract with Wally Downes' Brentford in September 2003, only to be sent off twelve minutes into his debut against Tranmere Rovers. Due to his subsequent suspension and an ankle injury he never played for the club again and instead switched to Barnet of the Conference. He scored on his "Bees" debut in a win at Stevenage, he played for free and impressed enough to win a short-term contract out of manager Martin Allen. He scored five goals in fifteen games in 2003–04, before joining non-league side Team Bath as a player-coach in December 2003. In June 2004 he moved from Bath to become player-commercial manager at Clevedon Town.

Management career

Taunton Town
He worked as manager at Taunton Town from June 2005 to October 2005.

Newport County
In October 2005, Beadle replaced John Cornforth as manager of Conference South side Newport County. His new club were on a run of seven successive defeats in the league, and following defeats in his first three games in charge, Beadle managed to slowly turn the club around. One of his first signings as manager was controversial striker Craig Hughes who had previously served a prison sentence for football hooliganism whilst on Cardiff City's books. By the end of the 2005–06 campaign his team went on a run of six wins in eight games, and avoided relegation by a four-point margin.

In the 2006–07 season Newport progressed through the FA Cup qualifying rounds to face Swansea City in the FA Cup First Round. Fifteen minutes into the match Beadle was sent off by referee Anthony Bates after Beadle disputed a free-kick awarded to Swansea. As he left the field, Beadle confronted the fourth official, and a member of the crowd wounded the official by throwing a coin. In a post-match interview Beadle claimed not to have witnessed the attack and defended his 'passionate' approach to the game, claiming he did not deserve to be sent from the field for his outburst. Newport were subsequently fined a total of £3,000 after being found guilty of failing to control both their manager and their crowd. Beadle received a seven-match touchline ban after accepting misconduct charges, and was fined £1,500, half of which was suspended subject to good behaviour. He also issued an apology, stating that "I let not only myself and my family but my football club down."

County went on to finish 2006–07 in sixth place, missing out on the play-offs following a final day defeat at home to Cambridge City – had they won the game they would have qualified for the play-offs. They did though the reach the final of the FAW Premier Cup, where they lost 1–0 to The New Saints. During the campaign Beadle signed three veteran players: Dean Holdsworth (who would later replace him as manager), Darren Garner, and Nathan Blake. The 2007–08 season saw the last instalment of the FAW Premier Cup, and Beadle led his club to the final with shock wins over the two Welsh giants: Swansea City and Cardiff City. A 1–0 win over Llanelli in the final meant that Newport got to keep the trophy and the £100,000 prize money. However Newport finished ninth in the league in 2007–08, once again a final day defeat at Newport Stadium cost them a place in the play-offs. Had they beaten Fisher Athletic then they would have finished fifth, and would have guaranteed themselves a play-off spot. This disappointment cost Beadle his job, as the day after the defeat, 27 April, he was sacked . He was succeeded by Dean Holdsworth in May 2008.

Clevedon Town
In March 2010 Beadle was appointed manager of Clevedon Town. He vacated the position in the summer after failing to prevent their relegation from the Southern League Premier Division. He later worked at West Bromwich Albion's development centre, before he was recruited into Cheltenham Town's Centre of Excellence by John Brough.

Hereford
In April 2013, Beadle was appointed director of youth football at Hereford United. On 20 March 2014 Beadle was named caretaker manager following the departure of Martin Foyle. The "Bulls" ended the 2013–14 season in 20th place, finishing above the relegation zone on goal difference after beating Aldershot Town 2–1 at the Recreation Ground on the final day of the season. After this success he was invited to apply for the position on a permanent basis, but was never interviewed. In May 2014, Beadle was appointed head coach at Sutton United by manager Paul Doswell.

In April 2015, he was appointed as the first ever manager of Hereford, the successor club to Hereford United. He won a treble in his first season as manager, 2015–16, as Hereford won the Midland League, Midland League Cup, and Herefordshire County Cup. He also took Hereford to the 2016 FA Vase Final at Wembley Stadium, where they lost 4–1 to Morpeth Town. He achieved a second successive promotion in 2016–17 after leading Hereford to the Southern League Division One South & West title with six games to spare. After winning 36 of their 46 Southern League Premier Division games during the 2017–18 season, Hereford again won promotion with a third consecutive promotion. He was sacked on 13 September 2018, with the club lying 12th in National League North after eight games.

Barnet
On 22 August 2020, he was appointed as manager of Barnet, who had ended the 2019–20 campaign seventh in the National League. Chairman Anthony Kleanthous said that he selected Beadle over more than 100 other candidates and that he would have to work with a "leaner" squad. Beadle left the post on 13 December 2020, the day after a 6–0 defeat by Chesterfield left the "Bees" winless in nine games and just one point above the relegation zone.

Yate Town
On 8 May 2022, Beadle was appointed manager of Yate Town, who had finished seventh in the Southern League Premier Division. On 23 October 2022, Beadle resigned despite receiving a vote of confidence from the board of directors after completely rebuilding the playing squad in the summer.

Personal life
He married Clare and had two children.

Career statistics

Playing statistics
Source:

Managerial statistics

Honours

As a player
Bristol City
 Football League Trophy: 2002–03

As a manager

Newport County
 FAW Premier Cup: 2007–08; runner-up: 2006–07

Hereford
 Southern League Division One South & West Premier Division: 2017–18
 Southern League Division One South & West Division One South & West: 2016–17
 Midland League: 2015–16
 Midland League Cup: 2016
 Herefordshire County Cup: 2016
 FA Vase runner-up: 2015–16

References

1972 births
Living people
Footballers from Lambeth
English footballers
Association football forwards
Gillingham F.C. players
Margate F.C. players
Tottenham Hotspur F.C. players
AFC Bournemouth players
Southend United F.C. players
Watford F.C. players
Bristol Rovers F.C. players
Port Vale F.C. players
Notts County F.C. players
Bristol City F.C. players
Brentford F.C. players
Barnet F.C. players
Team Bath F.C. players
Clevedon Town F.C. players
English Football League players
Southern Football League players
National League (English football) players
English football managers
Taunton Town F.C. managers
Newport County A.F.C. managers
Clevedon Town F.C. managers
Hereford United F.C. managers
Hereford F.C. managers
Barnet F.C. managers
Yate Town F.C. managers
National League (English football) managers
Southern Football League managers
Association football coaches
West Bromwich Albion F.C. non-playing staff
Cheltenham Town F.C. non-playing staff
Hereford United F.C. non-playing staff